The 2011 Atlanta Silverback season was the club's fifteenth year of existence, and their first year in the North American Soccer League (NASL). It's the team's first year back after a two-year hiatus from competitive play.

On January 25, the Silverbacks announced their full schedule in the NASL. The Silverbacks will host each NASL opponent twice over the course of the season.

On March 8, the Silverbacks announced three preseason games against Southern Polytechnic State University, Georgia State University and Clayton State University. All three games resulted in a scoreless tie.

Background 
The 2011 season marked the Silverbacks return to American soccer following a two-year hiatus, that did not see the organization field a senior men's team throughout the 2009 and 2010 seasons.

Review 
The return season was arguably an abysmal campaign for the Silverbacks, as the club lost 20 of its 28 regular season matches, drawing and winning four matches apiece. During the regular season, the Silverbacks were mathematically eliminated from playoff contention with seven weeks left in the NASL regular season. José Manuel Abundis, then the head coach, was fired following the season replaced by then-assistant coach, Alex Pineda Chacón, whom played for the Silverbacks from 2003 to 2004. The announcement came on November 7, 2011.

Club

Roster

Technical Staff 
  José Manuel Abundis – Head Coach
  Alex Pineda Chacón – Assistant Coach
  José Pinho – Goalkeeper Coach
  Rodrigo Rios – Director of Soccer

Competitions

Preseason

NASL

Standings

Results summary

Results by round

Match results

Statistics

Appearances and goals

Last updated: August 30, 2011

Clean sheets

Disciplinary record 

.

Transfers

In

Out

Loan in

Loan out

See also 
 2011 in American soccer
 2011 North American Soccer League season
 Atlanta Silverbacks

References 

2011
Atlanta Silverbacks
Atlanta Silverbacks
Atlanta Silverbacks